"A Drop of Nelson's Blood" is a sea shanty, also known as "Roll the old chariot along" (Roud No. 3632) The origins are unclear, but the title comes from the first line: "A drop of Nelson's blood wouldn't do us any harm". Often described as a "walkaway" or "runaway chorus" or "stamp and go" sea shanty, the song features on the soundtrack of the 2019 film Fisherman's Friends. The chorus comes from the 19th century Salvation Army hymn, 'Roll the old chariot'. This song developed into a shanty.

Composition
The verses are things the sailors would miss while at sea for a long time with each line being repeated three times. The last line is always "And we'll all hang on behind", although some versions say "we won't drag on behind".

Nelson's blood
Following his victory and death at the Battle of Trafalgar, Nelson's body was preserved in a cask of brandy, or rum, to allow transport back to England. ‘Nelson's blood' became a nickname for rum, but it can also mean Nelson's spirit or bravery.

The shanty was sung to accompany certain work tasks aboard sailing ships, especially those that required a bright walking pace.
Although Nelson is mentioned in the title, there is no evidence that the shanty dates from the time of Nelson, who died in 1805.

Song text

Origins

The term 'Roll the chariot' was used by religious groups in the 19th century in England.  The Primitive Methodist preacher William Clowes mentions the phrase several times in his journals (1810 to that of 1838) describing his work spreading the word of God.
In the 1880s, 'Roll the old Chariot' was used by the Salvation Army as a campaign hymn. At around the same time Gospel singers from America were touring in the UK, singing gospel songs.

‘Roll the old chariot along'

Early recordings (Gospel version)
One of the oldest known recordings, dates from the early 1920s and is held by the Library of Congress. The wax cylinder was donated by Robert Winslow Gordon
An African-American spiritual version was recorded by Paul Robeson in the 1920s
1930 Roll the Old Chariot Along by Rev. T.T. Rose
Fela Sowande titled ‘Roll de ol chariot' was recorded in the 1950s

In print

An early publication of the song in America was published in 'Cabin and plantation songs'  (1901). 
Alec John Dawson in an article that was published in The Standard in 1906.
The song is mentioned by James Madison Carpenter in his collection of songs published in 1920.
According to John Greenway in his book Folk Nation: Folklore in the Creation of American Tradition, it became a protest song for the coal miners.

Notable recordings (shanty version)
1978 American folksinger, Mary Benson of Portland, Oregon, used the shanty on her album 'Sea Songs Seattle' by Folkways Records. 
1983 Jim Mageean and Johnny Collins sang Roll the Old Chariot on their album, Strontrace!.
2006 Jarvis Cocker appeared on the album Rogue's Gallery: Pirate Ballads, Sea Songs, and Chanteys
2010 David Coffin posted a version on YouTube which now has over five million views as of November 2021
2012 Storm Weather Shanty Choir released an album named after the song which features the song as the opening track. 
2013 The Wellington Sea Shanty Society released a version of the song on their album Now That's What I Call Sea Shanties Vol. 1.
2021 The Longest Johns uploaded a version to their YouTube channel, under the title "Drop of Nelsons Blood (Roll the Old Chariot)"
2021 Industrial/Steampunk band Abney Park released a version on their album "Technoshanties"
2022 Nathan Evans - The Wellerman Album - Produced by Saltwives

References

External links
Example version with lyrics.
 Clip from the Fisherman's Friends film

Sources
Waltz, Robert B.; David G. Engle. "Roll The Old Chariot". The Traditional Ballad Index: An Annotated Bibliography of the Folk Songs of the English-Speaking World, hosted by California State University, Fresno, Folklore, 2007.
 "Roll the Old Chariot" Roud Folksong Index, hosted by the Vaughan Williams Memorial Library (VWML)

19th-century songs
Sea shanties
Songs about alcohol
Songs about sailors
English children's songs
English folk songs
Year of song unknown
Songwriter unknown
Songs about death
Songs about military officers
Cultural depictions of Horatio Nelson